Marko Kristian Kiprusoff (born June 6, 1972) is a Finnish former professional ice hockey defenceman. He is currently an assistant junior coach in Finnish hockey club TPS.

Draft
He was drafted by the Montreal Canadiens as their third-round pick, 70th overall, in the 1994 NHL Entry Draft.

Playing career

SM-liiga Career
Marko Kiprusoff started his hockey career with TPS. Kiprusoff also had a three-game visit to HPK during his earlier seasons in the SM-liiga. Kiprusoff earned a reputation as a solid offensive defenceman at TPS and after his successful performances for the Finnish National team and TPS, Kiprusoff was contracted by the Montreal Canadiens.

Kiprusoff won the SM-liiga championship twice, in 1993 and 1995. Kiprusoff also captured the European Championship with TPS in 1994.

First NHL visit
Kiprusoff spent the 1995–96 season with the Montreal Canadiens but he didn't make much of an impact in the NHL. Kiprusoff played 24 games for the Canadiens and 28 more for Montreal's AHL-affiliate, the Fredericton Canadiens.

Return to Europe
After his initial season in the NHL, Kiprusoff played two seasons in the Swedish Elitserien for Malmö IF, after which he returned to TPS in 1998. Kiprusoff won two more SM-liiga championships with TPS, making him a four-time SM-liiga champion. Kiprusoff then played the 2001–02 with the New York Islanders and played after that for EHC Kloten in Switzerland.

In 2004 Kiprusoff returned again to TPS, where he played until the end of the 2008-09 season. On 21 May 2009 he signed a contract with French team Ducs d'Angers of the Ligue Magnus.
Kiprusoff made a two-year player/coach-contract with the Kuusamon Pallo-Karhut in June 2011. He played in Kuusamo in January 2011, one game, making two points.

International play

Kiprusoff was a mainstay on the Finnish national team during the most of the '90s. Kiprusoff played 198 National Team games and was on the Finnish national team when they won Finland's first Ice Hockey World Championships gold medal in 1995.

Kiprusoff's last international tournament callup was during the 2003 World Championship Tournament.

Awards
 Pekka Rautakallio trophy for best defenceman in the SM-liiga - 1995
 Raimo Kilpiö trophy for gentleman player in the SM-liiga - 1999

Personal life
He is the older brother of Miikka Kiprusoff.

Career statistics

Regular season and playoffs

International

See also
List of Olympic medalist families

External links

1972 births
Cleveland Barons (2001–2006) players
Ducs d'Angers players
Finnish ice hockey defencemen
Finnish ice hockey world championship gold medalists
Finnish people of Russian descent
HPK players
Ice hockey players at the 1994 Winter Olympics
EHC Kloten players
KooKoo players
Living people
Malmö Redhawks players
Montreal Canadiens draft picks
Montreal Canadiens players
New York Islanders players
Olympic bronze medalists for Finland
Olympic ice hockey players of Finland
Olympic medalists in ice hockey
Sportspeople from Turku
HC TPS players
TuTo players
Medalists at the 1994 Winter Olympics